The Nelson Falls, a cascade waterfall, is located in the UNESCO World Heritagelisted Tasmanian Wilderness, in the West Coast region of Tasmania, Australia.

Location and features

See also

 List of waterfalls of Tasmania

References

Waterfalls of Tasmania
Western Tasmania
Cascade waterfalls